Talpa Network is a Dutch media conglomerate created by John de Mol Jr. in 2017.

History 
Talpa Network was created in 2017 by John de Mol when he merged all his various media assets, De Mol wanted to create a Dutch media conglomerate that could stand against foreign media companies entering the Dutch market. Talpa Holding and Sanoma acquired SBS Broadcasting in 2011, the Netherlands Authority for Consumers and Markets forced De Mol to sell his minority stake in RTL Nederland. De Mol would remain a minority shareholder in SBS Broadcasting, until 2017 when his Talpa Holding acquired all remaining shares in SBS Broadcasting from Sanoma for €237 million. After the sale of RTL Nederland, De Mol took full ownership of Radio 538, SLAM! FM and Radio 10 Gold. In October 2016 De Mol merged his radio stations with the radio stations of the Telegraaf Media Groep into Talpa Radio, a joint venture in which he would hold a 77% stake. He also wanted to fully acquire the Telegraaf Media Groep in which he already had a minority share and merge it with SBS Broadcasting. The Belgian Mediahuis also made several offers for the remaining shares and were the winner of the acquisition, leaving De Mol as a minority shareholder. In December 2017 De Mol sold his 29% share to Mediahuis, but acquired full ownership of Talpa Radio. Other notable acquisitions were StukTV (2018), ANP (2018), Linda. Magazine (2019), Gierige Gasten (2019) and TVGids.tv (2019).

Proposed merger 
After John de Mol raised his stake in SBS Broadcasting in 2017 to full ownership he sought a partnership with RTL Nederland. In his opinion there wasn't enough space for two major Dutch commercial television networks in the changed media landscape, RTL shut down his offer. However, in June 2021 RTL Nederland and Talpa Network announced plans for a merger, pending approval by the European Commission and the Netherlands Authority for Consumers and Markets. In the new conglomerate, RTL Nederland is to hold 70% of the shares and Talpa Holding 30%. Talpa Entertainment Productions and Talpa Concepts won't be a part of the merger. Both parties reasoned that a merger was the only solution to an ever growing presence of foreign media parties, giving space to a single commercial Dutch media company that's capable of producing specifically for the Dutch market. Critics however claimed that the failing of Talpa Network is the reason behind the merger. In January 2022 the Netherlands Authority for Consumers and Markets stated that it could not approve the merger as of yet and that further investigation to the consequences of price, quality and innovation is necessary. On the 30th of January 2023 the Authority announced that it would not approve the merger, citing that the merged company would become too powerful.

Assets

Talpa TV 
 SBS6, flagship channel of the group
 Net5, focused on the female demographic
 Veronica, focused on the male demographic. Shares the channel with Disney XD.
 SBS9, focused on movies and series

Talpa Radio

 Radio 538
 TV538, an online television channel
 Radio 10
 Sky Radio
 Radio Veronica
 Various digital stations

Talpa Digital

 KIJK, catching up service
 JUKE, online radio platform
 TVGids.tv
 Voetbal TV
 Weer.nl

Talpa Social

 StukTV, YouTube channel acquired in 2018
 Gierige Gasten, YouTube channel acquired in 2019
 S1, influencer agency
 New Wave
 Shout Out

Other

 LINDA., magazine and online platform
 Talpa Entertainment Producties
 Talpa Events
 Talpa Gaming, joint venture with Azerion
 Talpa Media Solutions, advertisement agency
 Talpa E-Commerce

Former assets

Talpa TV / Tien (2004-2007), Talpa TV started in late 2004 and began its broadcasts on 13 August 2005 under the same name Talpa. Talpa (later Tien) was from 13 August 2005 to see every day from 18:00 on the channel that was filled during the day by the children's channel Nickelodeon. From Saturday, 16 December 2006 the station was broadcasting 24 hours a day. That was a long cherished wish of Talpa-founder John de Mol fulfilled. The station distinguished itself from the competition by allowing existence more than 80% of its interpretation of Dutch products. In addition, managed Talpa Content the majority of its program rights. On 27 June 2007 the channel stopped due to disappointing ratings. The channel was sold to RTL Nederland and was rebranded to RTL 8.
RTL Nederland (2007-2011), Talpa Holding had a 26.3% share obtained after their sell of channel Tien and radio station Radio 538.
Talpa Radio
4FM (2004 - 2007)
Radio 100 FM (2003-2009)
Noordzee FM
 Fuel for Travel, a digital content store at Schiphol Airport.
 Mundo, an independent dating site.
 Skoeps.nl (2006-2008),  in October 2006 Talpa Holding, together with PCM Uitgevers, launched the news-in-picture Skoeps.nl website. Aim of this website was to offer user-generated content; visitors could post their own news photos and videos. Should user-generated content be successfully sold to other news media, then profits would be shared with the creator. Operations were terminated on 5 May 2008 because they never became profitable.
Talpa Music (2005-2014), Talpa Music engages in the international and national production of music, the exploitation of copyrights, music publishing, production and licensing of image and sound carriers, developing artists and their image (merchandise), advice on music industry and the exploitation of music in the area of internet applications. On an international level Talpa Music works with composers among others Burt Bacharach, Tom Waits, Bill Withers, Maxi Jazz (Faithless) and Lil John (Usher). It was eventually sold to BMG Rights Management.
Talpa Media (2005-2019), production company sold to ITV Studios in 2015.
Talpa Scandinavia (2006-2007)
Radio Digitaal (2006-2008), the first Dutch commercial online radio platform.
ANP (2018-2021), news agency sold to investor Chris Oomen.

References

External links
 Official website

Companies based in North Holland
Holding companies of the Netherlands
Television production companies of the Netherlands
Television production companies of the United Kingdom
Television production companies of the United States
Laren, North Holland
Talpa Network